The Eduardo H. Gato House (also known as the Mercedes Hospital) is a historic home in Key West, Florida, United States. On April 11, 1973, it was added to the U.S. National Register of Historic Places Eduardo H. Gato and family also lived at 1327 Duval Street, also known as the southernmost Point Guest House.

It has also been known as Mercedes Hospital. A Cuban immigrant, Gato was a successful cigar merchant. The Victorian architecture wooden home with a Cuban style courtyard was documented as part of the Historic American Buildings Survey. Now a private residential apartment complex, the site includes a historical marker.

References

External links

Monroe County listings at Florida's Office of Cultural and Historical Programs

Landmarks in Key West, Florida
History of Key West, Florida
Houses in Key West, Florida
National Register of Historic Places in Key West, Florida
Historic American Buildings Survey in Florida